"Somewhere Out There" is a song released by MCA Records and recorded by American singers Linda Ronstadt and James Ingram for the soundtrack of the animated film An American Tail (1986). The song was written by James Horner, Barry Mann, and Cynthia Weil, and produced by Peter Asher and Steve Tyrell. It reached number eight in the United Kingdom, number six in Ireland, and number two in both the United States and Canada.

Background
Steven Spielberg, the film's producer, invited songwriters Barry Mann and Cynthia Weil to collaborate with James Horner on four songs for its soundtrack, to be completed in a four-week timeframe. The composers "felt no pressure to come up with a radio-friendly hit" and were surprised when Spielberg felt the song had Top 40 hit potential and recruited world-renowned recording artists, Linda Ronstadt and James Ingram, to record a pop version of it for the film's closing credits. In the main body of the film, the song was performed by Phillip Glasser and Betsy Cathcart in the characters of the anthropomorphic mice Fievel and Tanya Mousekewitz. Produced by Ronstadt's regular producer Peter Asher, the single release of the Ronstadt/Ingram track made its debut at number 31 on the Adult Contemporary chart in Billboard dated 15 November 1986, crossing over to the Billboard Hot 100 dated 20 December 1986 with a number 83 debut. In January 1987, the song returned Ronstadt to the Top 40 after a four-year absence to eventually peak at number 2 on the week of March 14.

Music video
The music video for the song was directed, produced, and edited by Jeffrey Abelson. It was filmed in New York City and features Ronstadt and Ingram, in two separate rooms, sitting at their desks while drawing and coloring scenes from the film. They both look out the windows, in the same manner as Fievel and Tanya in it. Clips from the film appear throughout the video.

Theme
The lyrics convey the love felt by two people separated by vast distances, but cheered by the belief that their love will eventually reunite them to be with each other once again. In the main body of the film, the fictional characters singing the song, Fievel and Tanya Mousekewitz, are brother and sister, and the love they share is described as general. However, in the end title pop version of it, the love is described as more romantic.

Awards
At the 30th Grammy Awards, the song won two awards, one for Song of the Year and the other for Best Song Written Specifically for a Motion Picture or Television. It also garnered Ronstadt and Ingram a Grammy nomination for Best Pop Performance by a Duo or Group with Vocal.

It earned nominations for Best Original Song at the 44th Golden Globe Awards and the 59th Academy Awards, but lost both to "Take My Breath Away" from Top Gun. At the Academy Awards ceremony, Natalie Cole performed the song live with Ingram.

Charts and certifications

Weekly charts

Year-end charts

Certifications

Covers
In the spring of 1987, singer Liza Minnelli performed, in the words of music critic Stephen Holden of The New York Times, "a stunning rendition" of the song at Carnegie Hall for her three-week concert engagement at the historic music venue. The concert was recorded by Telarc Records and released in late 1987.

References 

1980s ballads
1986 songs
1986 singles
Linda Ronstadt songs
James Ingram songs
Songs written by James Horner
Songs written by Barry Mann
Pop ballads
Songs written for animated films
Songs with lyrics by Cynthia Weil
Love themes
An American Tail (franchise)
Grammy Award for Song of the Year
Grammy Award for Best Song Written for Visual Media
MCA Records singles
Male–female vocal duets